The 1955–56 Ranji Trophy was the 22nd season of the Ranji Trophy. Bombay won the title defeating Bengal in the final.

Zonal Matches

North Zone 

(T) – Advanced to next round by spin of coin.

South Zone

West Zone

Central Zone

East Zone

Inter-Zonal Knockout matches

Final

Scorecards and averages
Cricketarchive

References

External links

1956 in Indian cricket
Ranji Trophy seasons